The History of Dasam Granth is related to the time of creation and compilation of various writings by Guru Gobind Singh in form of small booklets, some of which are Sikh prayers. Some writings are in question as the guru did not compile the book himself. After 1708, a combined form of those booklets, the present-day granth or single volume, was compiled by Mani Singh Khalsa, contributed by other Khalsa armymen under direct instructions of Mata Sundari and this volume is recognized as Sri Dasam Granth Sahib. Present day Dasam Granth includes Jaap Sahib, Akal Ustat, Bachitar Natak, Chandi Charitar Ukati Bilas, Chandi Charitar II, Chandi di Var, Gyan Prabodh, Chaubis Avtar, Rudra Avtar, 33 Sawaiye, Khalsa Mahima, Shashtar Nam Mala Purana, Ath Pakh-yaan Charitar Likh-yatay and Zafarnamah.

Some argue that Guru Gobind Singh did not compile the book himself, and the historic authenticity of some of the later additions to the Dasam Granth was questioned from its compilation stage.  It is also questioned by many scholars like Babu Teja Singh Bhasod, Bhai Kahan Singh Nabha, W.H. Mcleod, Bhag Singh Ambala, Prof. Harinder Singh Mehboob, Gurtej Singh IAS, (Sikh Missionary) Dr. Rattan Singh Jaggi, (Sikh Missionary) Professor Darshan Singh, (excommunicated Sikh Missionary Kala Afghana) and Gurbaksh Singh Kala Afghana (Sikh Missionary). Their prevalent views are that Dasam Granth was written by Nirmala scholars or Hindu Pundits or Saktas scholars and was an attempt to hindulise Sikhism. According to them, some of the compositions included in Dasam Granth (such as Charitropakhyan) are out of tune with other Sikh scriptures, and must have been composed by other poets.

Ram Raiyas of Payal were first recorded critic in Sikh history who attacked on Ragi Bulaki Singh for reading hymns of Dasam Granth. Ram Raiyas as considered as enemies of the Guru family as Ram Rai was excluded from Guru Har Rai because of his dishonest behavior

Resources

Following are early Sikh references of historical books and manuscripts mentioning different compositions and poetry from Dasam Granth:

17th century resources

Sri Gur Katha, Bhai Jaita
Sri Gur Katha is work of Bhai Jiwan Singh, composed in the last decade of the seventeenth century, does not mention about Dasam Granth but does mention Chopai (Charitar 404), Savaiyey(Akal Ustat) and Jaap Sahib recitation during creation of Khalsa Panth.

18th century resources

Rehitnama, Bhai Prehlad Singh
This booklet contains short poem having 38 couplets written by Bhai Prehlad Singh in the early 18th century, whose hymn, Sab Sikhan ko Hukam hai Guru Maneyo Granth, is heavily quoted among Sikhs. This Rahitnama mentioned first composition of Dasam Granth i.e. Jaap Sahib, a Sikh liturgy. Following is a quote from the same:
ਬਿਨਾ 'ਜਪੁ' 'ਜਾਪੁ' ਜਪੇ, ਜੋ ਜੇਵਹਿ ਪਰਸਾਦਿ || 
One who is spending life(doing religious activities) without Understanding of Japuji Sahib and Jaap Sahib,
ਸੋ ਬਿਸਟਾ ਕਾ ਕਿਰਮ ਹੂਇ, ਜਨਮ ਗਵਾਵੈ ਬਾਦ ||
he is living insect of excreta and will lose this birth.

Rehatnama Hazuri, Bhai Chaupa Singh
This Rehitnama is the most elaborate statement of rules of conduct for the Sikhs which is traditionally ascribed to Bhai Chaupa Singh Chhibbar concluded AD 1702–1706. This rehitnama states various lines from different Banis of Dasam Granth.

Sri Gur Sobha, Poet Senapati
This historical book was completed by Senapati, The court poet of Guru Gobind Singh, after his demise in 1711. The source does not mention about Dasam Granth as Granth was compiled later to this source by Mani Singh. Though, this source mentioned the content of Bachitar Natak and Kalki Avtar.

The main topic is stated with the Akal Purkh's declaration of the purpose for which Guru Gobind Singh was deputed to take birth in this world. This is reminiscent of ‘Akal Purkh’s Bach’ of Bachittar Natak. The book ends with the poet's wishful thinking that the Master will come again to Anandgarh to redeem the world by defeating the evil forces and protecting and caring for the holy persons. This is on similar lines as Nihkalank Kalki Avtar described in Dasam Granth which indicates the presence of Bachitar Natak during that period. This book is written not only in the style and language of the Sri Dasam Granth but some verses are similar to the verses found in Sri Bachitra Natak, most notably the battles of Guru Gobind Singh.

Letter to Mata Sundri, Bhai Mani Singh
The letter is claimed to have been written by Bhai Mani Singh to Mata Sundari in 1716, after 8 years of demise of Guru Gobind Singh. This manuscript provides evidence of existence of 303 Charitars, Shastar Nam Mala and Krishna Avtar compositions. Among critics Gyani Harnam Singh Balabh believes that only 303 Charitars were written by Guru Gobind Singh among 404 Charitars in Charitropakhyan. The authenticity of this letter is questionable and has been proved forged by many scholars.

Parchi Gobind Singh - Bava Sevadas
This manuscript was finished sometime in the first quarter of the eighteenth century(around 1741) by Seva Das, an Udasi. This book mentioned two shabads of Rama Avtar and from 33 Swaiyey. It also mentioned that Guru Gobind Singh had written Zafarnamah and stories in Hikaaitaan during his lifetime. This serves as evidence of existence of these hymns and composition during the early 18th century and its spread among scholars and common people of that period.

The source does not mention about Dasam Granth as it contains events of Guru's lifetime but it evident existence of 4 compositions in the early 18th century.

Gurbilas Patshahi 10, Bhai Koer Singh Kalal
This book mentioned about serve as evidence to Guruship to Guru Granth Sahib, written in 1751 after 43 years of Guru Gobind Singh demise also mentioned most of the compositions of Dasam Granth. Though, this book does not cover events happened after the demise of Guru in much detail.

This book confirms writing of Chobis Avtar, Jaap Sahib and Akal Ustat at Paonta, Bachitar Natak, Chandi di Var. It mentioned that Hikaaitaan was embedded at end of Zafarnama by Guru Gobind Singh and sent it to Aurangzeb.

Bansavalinama Dasan Patshahian Ka, Kesar Singh Chibbar

Bansvalinama was written is 1769 and covers the lives of the ten Gurus as well as other famed Sikhs. Kesar Singh explains and quotes verses from the Ugardanti. According to the Bansavlinama the Sikhs requested that Guru Gobind Singh merge Dasam Granth with the Guru  Granth Sahib.  The Guru responded to the request by saying, “The Adi Granth is the Guru. This (Dasam Granth) is my play. They shall remain separate. In many parts Kesar Singh quotes Dasam Granth compisions such as Chabius Avtar, Bachitar Natak and Khalsa Mehima.

Guru Kian Sakhian, Sarup Singh Kaushish
Guru Kian Sakhian is a historical piece of information about lives of Sikh Gurus written by Bhatt Sarup Singh Kaushish completed in 1790 AD at Bhadson and it is mostly referred book as it contains dates and events are sketchy and brief. This book does not mention about compilation of Dasam Granth but it does refer to writings inside Dasam Granth which includes Bachitar Natak written at Anandpur, Krishna Avtar wrote at Paunta Sahib. The book mentioned various lines from 33 Sawaiyey, Shastarnam Mala and terminology used in Dasam Granth.

19th century resources

Sketch of Sikhs, JB Malcolm
Among several valuable works John Malcolm completed Sketch of Sikhs in 1812 and mentioned about Dasam Granth which converted many to Sikhism to fight against tyranny. Following is a quote from his book: 
{{blockquote|Guru Govind Singh, in the Vichitra Natac, a work written by himself, and inserted in the Dasani Padshah ka Granth, traces the descent of the Kshatriya tribe of Sondhi, to which he belongs, from a race of Hindu head, and throw it into the fire, he would be resuscitated to the enjoyment of the greatest glory. The Guru excused himself from trying this experiment, declaring that he was content that his descendants should enjoy the fruits of that tree which he had planted.}}

Shaheed Bilas Bhai Mani Singh, Poet Seva Singh
Shaheed Bilas Bhai Mani Singh is a historical account of Bhai Mani Singh completed by Poet Seva Singh before 1846. He mentioned about writing of Krishna Avtar at Punta Sahib shown here under:
ਬਾਵਨ ਕਵੀ ਗੁਰੂ ਢਿਗ ਰਹੈ। ਮਨਿਆ ਉਨ ਮਹਿ ਗੁਨੀਆ ਅਹੈ।
ਸ੍ਰੀ ਮੁਖ ਤੋਂ ਕਲਗੀਧਰ ਆਪੈ। ਬੀਰ ਰਸ ਕੀ ਕਥਾ ਅਲਾਪੈ।
ਕ੍ਰਿਸ਼ਨ ਚਰਿਤਰ ਮਧ ਹੈ ਜਾਨੋ। ਖੜਗ ਸਿੰਘ ਕਾ ਯੁਧ ਪਛਾਨੋ।
ਜਿਸ ਤੇ ਸੁਨਤ ਕਾਇਰਤਾ ਭਾਗੈ।ਧਰਮ ਜੁਧ ਮਹਿ ਹੋਈ ਅਨੁਰਾਗੇ।
(ਚੋਪਈ 47, ਸ਼ਹੀਦ ਬਿਲਾਸ ਕਵੀ ਸੇਵਾ ਸਿੰਘ)

Compilation

Timeline

History of scripture's name
Guru Gobind Singh wrote various booklets and had a title on each of them. As per internal references, the scripture comprises the following major booklets:
Bachitar Natak Granth
Shastarnam Mala Purana
Charitropakhyan Granth
Gyan Prabodh Granth
Zafarnama: A letter to Aurangzeb

According to early Sikh historical resources, the scripture was not named as Dasam Granth and each composition within this scripture are named separately by various authors like:
 Bhai Koer Singh states Pratham Pehar Satgur Aise, Krishna Charitar Gavat hai Jaise Bava Sewa Dass states Keteyan Rubaiyan likhiyan keteyan badhshahaan ki sakhiyan likhiyan, aur apni haqiqat bhi likhiLater, In Bansavali Nama Patshahi 10, Kesar Singh Chibber named this granth as Chota Granth' '(The Small Granth).

In 1812, JB Malcolm called this scripture as Dasvein padhshsh da granth (The Scripture of 10th Ruler).

Later, Khalsa accepted the name Dasam Granth, for the reason that it contains compositions of 10th Guru of Sikhs.

References

Dasam Granth